Medeiros Neto is a municipality in the state of Bahia in the North-East region of Brazil.

It is named after the politician , active in the early 20th century.

See also
List of municipalities in Bahia

References

Municipalities in Bahia